Bala Haşimxanlı (also, Bala Haşımxanlı and Bala Gashimkhanly) is a village and municipality in the Sabirabad Rayon of Azerbaijan.  It has a population of 1,656.

References 

Populated places in Sabirabad District